The 1950 NBA playoffs was the postseason tournament of the inaugural National Basketball Association 1949–50 season. The tournament concluded with the Central Division champion Minneapolis Lakers defeating the Eastern Division champion Syracuse Nationals 4 games to 2 in the NBA Finals. 

Twelve teams qualified for the playoffs. Including tiebreaker games that preceded two of the six first-round series, they began play on Monday to Wednesday, March 20 to 22, and the best-of-seven Finals concluded in game six on Sunday, April 23. The champions played the greatest number of games, 13 in a span of 34 days, on a schedule including both back-to-back games and as many as six days off.

Bracket

The NBA was created in 1949 by merger of  two competing professional basketball leagues, the BAA and NBL. For its first season only, the NBA teams were arranged in three divisions: Eastern, comprising the five surviving BAA Eastern Division teams plus Syracuse from the NBL; Central, comprising the five surviving BAA Western Division teams; and Western, comprising all the NBL teams except Syracuse. Within each division the top four teams were matched in two rounds of short series to generate a champion, after which the three division champions contended for the NBA title. With three contenders the third round of the tournament comprised a bye for one and a best-of-three match between the other two.

Division Tiebreakers

Central Division Tiebreakers

Chicago Stags @ Fort Wayne Pistons

Minneapolis Lakers @ Rochester Royals

Division Semifinals

Central Division Semifinals

(1) Minneapolis Lakers vs. (4) Chicago Stags

This was the second playoff meeting between these two teams, with the Lakers winning the first meeting.

(2) Rochester Royals vs. (3) Fort Wayne Pistons

This was the first playoff meeting between these two teams.

Eastern Division Semifinals

(1) Syracuse Nationals vs. (4) Philadelphia Warriors

This was the first playoff meeting between these two teams.

(2) New York Knicks vs. (3) Washington Capitols

This was the second playoff meeting between these two teams, with the Capitols winning the first meeting.

Western Division Semifinals

(1) Indianapolis Olympians vs. (4) Sheboygan Red Skins

This was the first playoff meeting between these two teams.

(2) Anderson Packers vs. (3) Tri-Cities Blackhawks

This was the first playoff meeting between these two teams.

Division Finals

Central Division Finals

(1) Minneapolis Lakers vs. (3) Fort Wayne Pistons

This was the first playoff meeting between these two teams.

Eastern Division Finals

(1) Syracuse Nationals vs. (2) New York Knicks

This was the first playoff meeting between these two teams.

Western Division Finals

(1) Indianapolis Olympians vs. (2) Anderson Packers

This was the first playoff meeting between these two teams.

NBA Semifinals: (2) Minneapolis Lakers vs. (3) Anderson Packers

This was the first playoff meeting between these two teams.

NBA Finals: (1) Syracuse Nationals vs. (2) Minneapolis Lakers

 Bob Harrison hits the game-winning shot from 40 feet at the buzzer.

This was the first playoff meeting between these two teams.

Notes

References

External links
 1950 Playoff Results at NBA.com
 1950 NBA Playoffs at Basketball-Reference

National Basketball Association playoffs
Playoffs

it:National Basketball Association 1949-1950#Play-off
fi:NBA-kausi 1949–1950#Pudotuspelit